The "too connected to fail" (TCTF) concept refers to a financial institution which is so connected to other institutions that its failure would probably lead to a huge turnover in the whole system. Contrary to the "too big to fail" theory, this approach takes into consideration the highly connected network feature of the financial system rather than the absolute size of one particular institution.

Relevance of TCTF: systemic risk 

The 2007/2008 financial crisis highlighted that a small turmoil can cause a big fallback in the financial system – mainly because financial institutions form a highly interconnected network. From a network science point of view, this means that some nodes (institutions) have very high degree, i.e. they are linked to many other nodes. As a consequence, they play a central role in the system, which can be highly important in the case of disturbances. Recognition of this effect led to the revival of macroprudential regulation.

Measuring TCTF 

Determining which institute is TCTF is not as straightforward as in the case of the "too big to fail" theory. In this case, one doesn't have easily measurable metrics like assets’ value or the volume of financial services. However, there are some approaches trying to establish a clear method in order to identify the key institutions in the network.

Eigenvector Centrality 

Nacaskul posits that a financial institution is systemically important if it is highly connected (e.g. via interbank lending market/money market channel) to systemically important banks. Those, in turn, are systemically important if they are highly connected to systemically important banks, and so on. The recursive definition is equivalent to performing eigendecomposition of a matrix of connectivity weights and assigning systemic importance in proportion to the values of the principal eigenvector. The "entropic" factor correction is introduced therein to correct for the possibility that performing eigendecomposition on weighted connectivity matrices may occasionally yield "degenerate" systemic importance scores (all financial institutions identical in terms of systemic importance). Nacaskul & Sabborriboon then extends the Systemic Importance Analysis (SIA) above, which focuses on systemic leverage each individual financial institution exerts on the overall system, to Systemic Vulnerability Analysis (SVA), whereby the overall system is assessed as to how vulnerable it is to disproportionate systemic leverages exerted by individual financial institutions, and applied the methodology to Thai interbank money-market funding matrix.

Node degree 

If one defines the links connecting the different nodes in the network, then the TCTF feature of a certain node can be examined using network science methodology. The most simple way of thinking about the role of an institution is the number of connections it has, which is called the degree of the node. Depending on the type of the network, one can define in and out-degree. Knowing the key players one can test the risk involved in the network by simulating targeted attacks (shocks).

One example for this method is the paper of León et al., which analyzed the systemic risk within Colombia’s financial market. They defined an institution's in-degree as its share in total traded value, and the out-degree as its share of total number of connections based on transactions in the paying system. Using these metrics they constructed an index of centrality that let them identify the key institutions in the system, and made it possible to test the network's resistance to shocks.

DebtRank (feedback centrality) 

Another way to measure the TCTF feature of an institution is based on the concept of feedback centrality. One example for this is the DebtRank introduced in the paper of Battiston et al. The authors defined financial institutions as nodes and directed edges as lending relations weighted by the amount of outstanding debt. Then, they computed the DebtRank for every node, which measures that in the case of the distress of the particular node what fraction of the total economic value is potentially affected. By doing this, they identified the key financial institutions in the US between 2008 and 2010.

See also 

 Systemically important financial institution
 Systemic risk
 Localism (politics)
 Local economic development
 Sovereignty
 Accountable autonomy

References

Financial services
Institutional economics
Systemic risk
Networks
World economy